Gray Line Worldwide is an international sightseeing company that consist of local sightseeing operator around the world. The company was founded in 1910 and operates worldwide through independent operators it calls "licensees" with a presence in most of the world's most popular sightseeing destinations. Gray Line does not provide sightseeing services directly, but rather provides its brand, promotional services and booking systems to licensees. Gray Line is also the largest direct supplier of destination services to online travel sellers, wholesalers and travel agents.

History

In March 1910, a young restaurateur called Louis Bush refurbished an old Mack Truck chassis, painted it blue and gray and began offering sightseeing tours around the city of Washington, D.C.

By 1926, Gray Line had expanded to other booming cities including New York, Chicago, Detroit, New Orleans, Los Angeles, San Francisco, as well as internationally to Toronto and Havana. With peacetime following World War II, Harry J. Dooley, a former Gray Line employee, acquired the company and helped re-establish Gray Line Chicago. Dooley soon became president of Gray Line and is today considered the father of the sightseeing industry.

With the advent of jet travel and increased gateways in the late 1940s and early 1950s, Dooley expanded Gray Line's market throughout the United States and established Gray Line companies in Canada, Mexico, Hawaii and Puerto Rico. The sudden popularity growth in motorcoach sightseeing helped position Gray Line as a leader in the sightseeing industry.

The brand is currently managed from an office based in Denver, Colorado.

Gray Line has a presence in over 700 locations, spanning six continents, and is the largest sightseeing company in the world. In 2018 its carriers handled over 35 million passengers.

Licensees

References

External links

 
Bus operating companies
Companies based in Denver
Transport companies established in 1910
1910 establishments in Washington, D.C.
City Sightseeing